The 1966–67 Chicago Bulls season was the first season of the franchise in the National Basketball Association (NBA).

Draft picks

Note: This is not an extensive list; it only covers the first and second rounds, and any other players drafted by the franchise that played at least one NBA game.

Roster

Regular season
The brand-new Chicago Bulls franchise earned its first victory on October 15, 1966, with a 104–97 win over the St. Louis Hawks. The team's coach was Johnny "Red" Kerr, a former player with the Syracuse Nationals, the Philadelphia 76ers, and the Baltimore Bullets. He is one of a select group of players to surpass the 10,000 mark in both rebounds and points, and he held the league record for consecutive games played with 844 until Randy Smith eclipsed his mark during the 1982–83 season.

Chicago's starting lineup on opening night included Len Chappell, Bob Boozer, Don Kojis, Jerry Sloan, and Guy Rodgers. In the team's victorious debut against St. Louis, Rodgers poured in a game-high 37 points. Three days later the Bulls ran their record to 2–0 by defeating the San Francisco Warriors, 119-116. Then, behind 34 points and 18 assists from Rodgers, Chicago upped its winning streak to three games with a 134–124 triumph over the defending Western Division champion Los Angeles Lakers.

Chicago finished with a 33–48 record, the best ever by an expansion team in its first year of play. The Bulls secured a playoff berth in the Western Division, but the Hawks eliminated them in the opening round. Kerr was named NBA Coach of the Year, and center Erwin Mueller made the NBA All-Rookie Team. Rodgers led the NBA in assists with 11.2 per game (including a club-record 24 against the New York Knicks on December 21) and also topped the team in scoring at 18.0 points per game. Rodgers and Sloan represented the new franchise in the 1967 NBA All-Star Game.

Season standings

Record vs. opponents

Game log

Playoffs

|- align="center" bgcolor="#ffcccc"
| 1
| March 21
| @ St. Louis
| L 100–114
| Kojis, Boozer (18)
| Bob Boozer (13)
| Rodgers, Clemens (2)
| Kiel Auditorium4,704
| 0–1
|- align="center" bgcolor="#ffcccc"
| 2
| March 23
| St. Louis
| L 107–113
| Bob Boozer (25)
| Kojis, Boozer (11)
| Guy Rodgers (11)
| International Amphitheatre3,739
| 0–2
|- align="center" bgcolor="#ffcccc"
| 3
| March 25
| @ St. Louis
| L 106–119
| McCoy McLemore (18)
| Bob Boozer (11)
| Guy Rodgers (5)
| Kiel Auditorium7,018
| 0–3
|-

Awards and records
Johnny "Red" Kerr, NBA Coach of the Year Award
Erwin Mueller, NBA All-Rookie Team 1st Team
Guy Rodgers, NBA All-Star Game
Jerry Sloan, NBA All-Star Game

References

Chicago Bulls seasons
Chicago
Chicago Bulls
Chicago Bulls